Horst Bellingrodt (born 7 May 1958) is a Colombian Olympic sports shooter. He finished eleventh in the 50 metre running target event at the 1984 Olympics.

His brothers Hanspeter and Helmut Bellingrodt were Olympians as well.

References

1958 births
Living people
Colombian male sport shooters
Running target shooters
Shooters at the 1984 Summer Olympics
Olympic shooters of Colombia
Colombian people of German descent
20th-century Colombian people